Mary Ryan may refer to:

Actresses
 Mary Ryan (actress) (1885-1948), American stage and screen actress
 Mary Nash (1884–1976), American vaudevillian, later stage/screen actress, whose birth name was Mary Ryan

Characters
 Mary Ryan (a.k.a. Blue Mary), a character from both the Fatal Fury and King of Fighters series of computer games
 Mary Ryan (character), character in Ryan's Hope
 Mary Ryan, character in The Divine Ryans

Sports
 Mary Ryan (Dublin camogie player), played in 1964 All-Ireland Senior Camogie Championship
 Mary Ryan (Tipperary camogie player), played in 2006 All-Ireland Senior Camogie Championship
 Mary Ryan (Galway camogie player), played in Gael Linn Cup 1981

Other notable people
 Mary Ryan (academic) (1873–1961), first woman professor in Ireland or Great Britain
 Mary Ryan (Irish politician) (1898–1981), Irish Fianna Fáil TD for Tipperary 1944–1961
 Mary A. Ryan (1940–2006), U.S. diplomat
 Mary P. Ryan, American historian
 Mary Ryan (writer), American TV writer/director
 Mary Perkins Ryan (1912–1993), American Catholic author, editor, and educator
 Mary Ryan (engineer), professor of materials science
 Mary Ryan, who spotted Momo the Monster

See also
 Mary Ryan, Detective, a 1949 American crime drama
Marie Ryan (disambiguation)